Graciliini is a tribe of beetles in the subfamily Cerambycinae, containing the following genera:

 Ambagous Fairmaire, 1896
 Araeotis Bates, 1867
 Aruama Martins & Napp, 2007
 Axinopalpis Dejean, 1835
 Bolivarita Escalera, 1914
 Caribbomerus Vitali, 2003
 Elaphopsis Audinet-Serville, 1834
 Gracilia Audinet-Serville, 1834
 Hybometopia Ganglbauer, 1889
 Hypexilis Horn, 1885
 Idobrium Kolbe, 1902
 Ischnorrhabda Ganglbauer, 1889
 Lianema Fall, 1907
 Lucasianus Pic, 1891
 Parommidion Martins, 1974
 Neomicrus Gahan, 1894
 Nisibistum Thomson, 1878
 Penichroa Mulsant, 1863
 Perigracilia Linsley, 1942
 Pseudobolivarita Sama & Orbach, 2003
 Raglicia Martins, Galileo & Santos-Silva, 2015
 Tritomacrus Newman, 1838

References

 
Cerambycinae
Beetle tribes